Ekşisu Picnic Area is an outdoor recreational area located in Erzincan, Turkey.

The picnic area is  far from Erzincan city center. Run by the Erzincan Municipality, it features playgrounds, amusement pools, walking trails, picnic tables and restaurants offering regional food. The region is rich on mineral water springs. The fountains  at the picnic area, which spend mineral water free of charge, are very  popular.

References

Outdoor recreation in Turkey
Tourist attractions in Erzincan Province
Important Bird Areas of Turkey